Reginald Parker (8 May 1916 – 5 April 1966) was an Australian sports shooter. He competed in the 300 m rifle event at the 1948 Summer Olympics.

References

External links
 

1916 births
1966 deaths
Australian male sport shooters
Olympic shooters of Australia
Shooters at the 1948 Summer Olympics
Place of birth missing